Privateer Press is a role-playing game, miniature wargame, acrylic paint, board game and card game production and publishing studio. Privateer Press is based in Bellevue, Washington, United States, where they have their headquarters and American factory/distribution center. They have also licensed a factory in the United Kingdom to increase production capacity for worldwide markets.

The company's signature products are Warmachine and Hordes, tabletop miniatures-based war games with a steampunk/magical aesthetic. Noted webcomic creators and game critics Jerry Holkins and Mike Krahulik of Penny Arcade are fans of Warmachine. Privateer Press used to publish a house magazine called No Quarter.

History
In 2000, Matt Wilson and his friend Brian Snoddy formed Privateer Press with writer Matt Staroscik to publish their own d20 supplements. Mike McVey joined the partnership early on as Miniatures Director. Wilson and Snoddy produced the covers and interior art for Privateer's first Iron Kingdoms adventures published in 2001. The company is currently owned by Wilson due to the departure of Snoddy and McVey.

Privateer next published Warmachine: Prime (2003), a miniatures wargame taking place in the same Iron Kingdoms setting as the company's first five role-playing game supplements it had already published. In 2009 Privateer partnered with WhiteMoon Dreams to create an adaptation of Warmachine for video game consoles.

On October 20, 2017, Privateer Press created Black Anchor Heavy Industries, an in-house production team to create huge based models while limiting production costs.

In September 2018 after 12 years of publication Privateer Press announced it would be ending publication of their bi-monthly magazine, "No Quarter".

Products 
The company's products are distinguished by the quality of their art, production values, and game play. They have received many game industry awards, including six Origins Awards and numerous ENnies.

List of titles
Formula P3 (Privateer Press Paint) acrylic paint
Privateer Press Masterworks painted statues
Iron Kingdoms steampunk fantasy universe
Iron Kingdoms Role-Playing Games
Iron Kingdoms Adventure Board Games (2 Titles - Undercity and Widower's wood)
Warmachine & Hordes miniature wargames
Grind miniature sports game
High Command deck-building card games
Riot quest miniature skirmish board game in alternate timeline to the Warmachine post Obllivion event
Warcaster neo-mechanika high-speed miniatures game
Bodgers family board and card games
Zombies Keep Out
BodgerMania
Heap
Infernal Contraption
Scrappers
Level 7 science-fiction board games
Level 7 [Escape]
Level 7 [Omega Protocol]
Level 7 [Invasion]
Monsterpocalypse collectible miniatures game
Monsterpocalypse: Voltron licensed standalone set

Charitable contributions
The company has been a longtime supporter of Child's Play, a charity which gives toys and games to sick kids in children's hospitals around the world. In 2009, Privateer Press bid on and won an item at the annual Child's Play Holiday auction, donated by Harmonix, which brought them the rights to commission a downloadable song track for the Rock Band game. The resulting song "Warmachine," written by Jerry Holkins, premiered at Pax 2010 and was made available for download that fall. All proceeds from the track are also donated to Child's Play.

References

External links
Privateer Press official website.
 Toy Directory Listing.
 Warmachine song on Rockband.

Role-playing game publishing companies
Game manufacturers
Companies established in 2000
Companies based in Seattle

Gaming miniatures companies